Baghlan (Dari: بغلان Baġlān) is a city in northern Afghanistan, in the eponymous province, Baghlan Province. It is located three miles east of the Kunduz River, 35 miles south of Khanabad, and about 500 metres above sea level in the northern Hindu Kush. Baghlan's capital, Pul-e-Khumri, is known to be an economic hub connected to eight other provinces by the Kabul-North highway.

History 
Baghlan grew as an urban centre in the 1930s as a result of a new road from Kabul across the Kunduz River.

Baghlan was the capital of the defunct Qataghan Province of northeastern Afghanistan, prior to the controversial 1964 dissolution.

Climate
With an influence from the local steppe climate, Baghlan features a cold semi-arid climate (BSk) under the Köppen climate classification. The average temperature in Baghlan is 15.8 °C, while the annual precipitation averages 284 mm.

July is the hottest month of the year with an average temperature of 28.3 °C. The coldest month January has an average temperature of 3.0 °C.

Economy 
Baghlan is the center of sugar beet production in Afghanistan. Cotton production and cotton manufacturing are also important in the region.

Demographics 
The population was estimated at 20,000 in 1960 and about 24,410 in 1963, an increase of 22.05% over three years. In 1965 the estimate was 92,432, an increase of 278.66% in two years. 
Its population was estimated to be 146,000 Urban and 616,500 Rural in 2011, of Tajiks, Pashtuns, Hazaras, Uzbeks and others.

2007 Bombing 

On 6 November 2007, a suicide bombing targeted a sugar factory in Baghlan during a visit by members of the National Assembly of Afghanistan. Up to 100 people have been reported killed, including six legislators.
One of the victims that was killed was Hajji Muhmmad Arif Zarif an MP from the Kabul province.

See also 
2007 Baghlan sugar factory bombing
Baghlan Province

References 
Notes

Sources
 Dupree, Nancy Hatch (1977): An Historical Guide to Afghanistan. 1st Edition: 1970. 2nd Edition. Revised and Enlarged. Afghan Tourist Organization.
 Baghlan

External links
World Gazetteer - City Information

Populated places in Baghlan Province
Populated places along the Silk Road